The 2017 Florida Cup was the third edition of Florida Cup, a friendly association football tournament played in the United States. The event was played under two different formats, one with points awarded to the participating clubs' countries and the other a single-match knockout tournament.

Teams

Challenge

Format
The "Challenge" will be played in a format similar to the Davis Cup, in tennis. Each team will play two matches and score points for their country. A victory yields three points, a tie one point, and an extra point is awarded for the winner in penalty shootouts. The country with the most points wins the competition. The first tiebreaking criteria will be goal difference, followed by goals scored.

Germany

Brazil

Argentina/United States

Challenge Matches

Playoff
The playoff tournament will be played with single-elimination matches.

Playoff Matches

Broadcasting

References

External links 

 

2017
2017 in American soccer
2017 in sports in Florida
January 2017 sports events in the United States